The Iran National Auto Loan was a short lived financial arrangement between the government of Hassan Rouhani Central Bank of the Islamic Republic of Iran, Iran Khodro, SAIPA and other Iranian car manufacturers who produced cars within the country.

A list of 21 vehicles, had been released initially but that number quickly changed as other car makers joined in on the offer. The auto loan ceiling had been set at 250 million rials ($7120 at market exchange rate) with an interest rate of between 16-18%. The payback period is a maximum seven years or 84 installments.

On November 15, 2015, The Central Bank of Iran sent a notice to automakers and dealers, asking them to watch for the limited number of car loans available.
In a letter to the Ministry of Industries, Mine and Trade posted on its website on Saturday, the CBI reminded auto industry officials that the total amount set for auto loan scheme can cover no more than 110,000 vehicles. By the end of the day the loan ceiling had been reached making it the fast rise in sales in any car industries history.

The loan is notable as it was the first and only financial offering by the Rouhani administration to offer a long term fixed-interest loan to the majority of car buyers. It is also notable that within the space of four days 110,000 car buyers put their name down for the item.

The announcement indicates that starting Monday November 9, buyers of Iranian-produced cars will be eligible for a loan of up to 80 percent of the purchase price.

Prior to the short term loan, vehicle production in Iran declined by 12.2% in the first seven months of the Iranian fiscal year (ended October 22) compared with the same period of last year.
A total of 284,472 passenger and heavy-duty vehicles were produced during the period. Statistics released by the Ministry of Industries, Mining and Trade show that during the seven months, vehicle production has declined at the country’s top two vehicle manufacturing companies, Iran Khodro Co. and SAIPA, by 14.4% and 13.4% respectively, Eghtesad News wrote.

Fallout of Loan 
After the abrupt end of the designated 6-month period, which happened under 7 days many would be car buyers were shocked to discover the entire loan amount ended so quickly. However, the government stated that auto loans would become part of a wider pack of financial policies over the course of the administration.

One writer covering the issue for the Financial Tribune noted at the time;

When the loan came to a screeching halt incredibly early, everybody was taken by surprise, including the government officials. It remains unlikely whether the government will allow for continuing the scheme in the same vein as untapped demand far outweighs supply.

Iran's head of the Department of Environment, Massoumeh Ebtekar following the end of the loan period noted;
“Given the current financial state of automakers, offering the loan was a sensible thing to do,”

Cars offered Finance

IKCO

Samand; the "Iranian national car". New vehicle price starts at $14,500 in Turkey.
Samand LX; a modified version of the basic Samand 
Samand SE; a modified version of the Samand LX with minor interior changes aiming to improve the car's overall quality.
Runna; IKCO's second "National Car"/all Iran-made car. Codenamed X12 during development and based on the modified 206 SD platform.
Dena; the car's estimated price is 18-25 thousand dollars for the ELX Luxury model and 14-18 thousand dollars for the LX model. The mid-size four-door class-D sedan has an Iranian-built EF7 turbocharged engine that produces 150 horsepower and a fuel efficiency rating of 7.2 liters per 100 kilometers. The car will be equipped with driver, front passenger’s, and side airbags, as well as front and rear ABS Disc Brakes. IKCO plans to manufacture 35,000 units of Dena in 2012, 80,000 units in 2013 and 100,000 units between 2015 and 2017.
IKCO Arisun A pickup based on the Peugeot 405 platform

Peugeot 

Peugeot 206; a saloon version of the 206, the Peugeot 206 SD also co-developed with Peugeot in year 2005.
Peugeot 405; available in saloon trims GLi and GLX and estate trim GLX
Peugeot Pars; initially called the Peugeot Persia. Changes include a redesigned front and modernized rear

Renault
Dacia Logan; both IKCO and Saipa produce the car as "Tondar90".

SAIPA 
 Saipa Tiba
 Kia Pride

Great Wall 
Great Wall Voleex C10

Bahman Group

Auto Loan Key Points 
 Auto Loan Key Facts
 * Loan remains fixed at 250 million rials
 * Over 40,000 people applied for loans in two days
 * Buyers must back up offer with post-dated checks
 * Some locally-made Chinese vehicles are included
 * SAIPA extends loan coverage to light commercial vehicles
 * Bahman Group and Modiran Khodro are also included
 * 40% of IKCO buyers opt for Peugeot 405
 * 70% of SAIPA buyers opt for Pride/Tiba
 * Sales offices not offering full seven-year payment plan.

References 

Science and technology in Iran
 
Finance in Iran